"She's a Beauty" is a song by American rock band The Tubes. Released in 1983 on The Tubes' album Outside Inside. Co-written by Fee Waybill, producer David Foster and Toto guitarist Steve Lukather, the song was inspired by Waybill's experience at a red light district in San Francisco. The music was largely written by Foster, who was also the source for the song's title.

When released as a single, "She's a Beauty" became the band's biggest chart hit. It went to number 10 on the US Billboard Hot 100 and number one on the Mainstream Rock Tracks chart. The release was boosted by a popular music video, featuring a boy riding a carnival ride with Waybill portraying a carnival barker.

Background
"She's a Beauty" was co-written by Fee Waybill, producer David Foster and Steve Lukather. Drummer Prairie Prince attributed the song's lyrics to Waybill and the music to Foster. Waybill says the song was originally inspired when he passed a booth on a San Francisco street outside a peep show, the booth being marked with a sign reading "Pay A Dollar, Talk to a Naked Girl," and the frustrating conversation that ensued between him and the woman inside the booth. Waybill explained:

Originally, the chorus was intended to include the line "You can talk to a naked girl," but producer David Foster convinced Waybill to change the lyric to the less offensive "You can talk to a pretty girl." Foster was also the source for the song's title, which Waybill characterized as indicative of Foster's Canadian nationality. The song is performed in the key of A Mixolydian in common time with a tempo of 111 beats per minute. The group's vocals span from A3 to D5 in the song.

Release
"She's a Beauty" was released as the debut single from the band's 1983 album, Outside Inside, with the non-album track "When You're Ready to Come" on the B-side. Continuing the more pop friendly direction of the band's previous album, the song became the band's biggest chart hit. The single reached number 10 in the US and topped the Billboard rock charts. Drummer Prairie Prince said of this pop success, "Well I guess you could say [it was] more commercial. I mean it's not something that we never wanted to do in the past–it's just something that never really happened for us before. David Foster we owe a lot to, because he's got that ear for a hit."

Music video
The popularity of "She's a Beauty" was largely driven by a narrative music video that became a staple of then-fledgling MTV. This video was directed by Kenny Ortega, also the choreographer of The Tubes' stage shows. Ortega achieved greater success choreographing movies such as Dirty Dancing and Ferris Bueller's Day Off, and as a director with High School Musical and its sequels.

Initially, the music video was intended to feature a version of a freak show based on the film Freaks; this was ultimately rejected by the record company as "too weird," so the band instead came up with the idea of the carnival ride. Other ideas were also blocked by the record company; Waybill recalled, "They constantly censored us...We had a topless mermaid, and of course, that was right out - we had to change that, and a bunch of stuff. It was just a little too weird for MTV. We had a great big paper breast - a big screen with an air-brushed breast on it. And the guy in the ride for 'She's a Beauty' would go crashing through it. Well, that was too weird, and they had to kind of soft-focus that whole thing, so it looked like a big fuzzy ball."

Waybill plays a carnival barker, a role he would reprise in live renditions of the song. He takes money from a young boy who then rides a carnival car through hallucinogenic scenes of a mermaid, female trapeze artist, prehistoric women dressed in furs, and others. The recurring theme is that he is attracted but is unable to reach them. At the end of the video we see the boy exiting the ride aged to an old man, the message apparently being the financial and emotional cost of falling in love with but being unable to obtain his heart's desire.

The role of the young boy was the first acting job for 13-year-old Alexis Arquette (then known as Robert Arquette).

Charts

Weekly charts

Year-end charts

See also
List of Billboard Mainstream Rock number-one songs of the 1980s

References

1983 singles
1983 songs
The Tubes songs
Songs written by David Foster
Songs written by Fee Waybill
Songs written by Steve Lukather
Song recordings produced by David Foster
Capitol Records singles